Roche (F. Hoffmann–La Roche) is a Swiss healthcare company.

Roche may also refer to:

Companies
Roche Diagnostics, a division of F. Hoffmann–La Roche
 Roche Applied Science, a business group of Roche Diagnostics

Places

France 
Roche, Isère, in the Isère department
Roche, Loire, in the Loire department
Roches, Creuse, in the Creuse department
Roches, Loir-et-Cher, in the Loir-et-Cher department

Switzerland 
 Roche, Vaud, in the Aigle district, canton of Vaud
 Roches, Switzerland, a village in the canton of Bern

United Kingdom 
 Roche, Cornwall
 Roche Abbey, South Yorkshire, England

United States 
 Roche de Bout, a rock formation in the Maumee River near the town of Waterville, Ohio, in Farnsworth Metropark

Further afield 
 Roche (crater), a crater on the Moon

People
 Roche (surname)
 Roche baronets, baronetcy of Great Britain
 Roche Braziliano, Dutch buccaneer
 The Roches, Irish-American singer-songwriter group of siblings

Science and mathematics
 Roche limit (also known as the "Roche radius"), a concept in celestial mechanics
 Roche lobe, a concept in celestial mechanics
 Roche (spider), a spider genus in the family Ochyroceratidae
 Rouché's theorem

Other uses
 Roch (disambiguation)
 Rivière des Roches (disambiguation)
 Roche convention, a defense against a one notrump (1NT) opening in contract bridge
 Ruché, an Italian wine grape